Li Jiating (born 1944) is an ethnic Yi People's Republic of China politician. He was born in Shiping County, Yunnan. He was a graduate of Tsinghua University. He was mayor of Harbin, Heilongjiang and governor of his home province. He was an alternate member of the 14th Central Committee of the Chinese Communist Party (1992–1997) and 15th Central Committee of the Chinese Communist Party (1997–2002). He was a delegate to the 9th National People's Congress (1998–2003).

He was expelled from the communist party for corruption.

References

External links
云南前省长李嘉廷案

1944 births
Governors of Yunnan
Mayors of Harbin
People from Shiping County
Tsinghua University alumni
Alternate members of the 14th Central Committee of the Chinese Communist Party
Alternate members of the 15th Central Committee of the Chinese Communist Party
Delegates to the 9th National People's Congress
Expelled members of the Chinese Communist Party
Chinese politicians convicted of corruption
Yi people
Living people